The 1959 Monaco Grand Prix was a Formula One motor race held at the Circuit de Monaco on 10 May 1959. It was race 1 of 9 in the 1959 World Championship of Drivers and race 1 of 8 in the 1959 International Cup for Formula One Manufacturers. It was also the 17th Monaco Grand Prix. The race was held over 100 laps of the three kilometre circuit for a race distance of 315 kilometres.

The race was won by Australian racer Jack Brabham driving a Cooper T51 for the factory Cooper Car Company team. It was the first win for Brabham, a future three-time world champion. It was the first World Championship Grand Prix victory by an Australian driver. It was also the first win for the factory Cooper team. Coopers had won races previously in the hands of Rob Walker Racing Team. Brabham finished 20 seconds ahead of British driver Tony Brooks driving a Ferrari 246. A lap down in third was the Cooper T51 of French driver and 1958 Monaco Grand Prix winner Maurice Trintignant of the Rob Walker Racing Team.

Classification

Qualifying

Race

Notes
 – Includes 1 point for fastest lap

Championship standings after the race

Drivers' Championship standings

Constructors' Championship standings

 Notes: Only the top five positions are included for both sets of standings.

References

Monaco Grand Prix
Monaco Grand Prix
Grand Prix
Monaco Grand Prix